The 2014–15 Oklahoma State Cowboys basketball team represented Oklahoma State University in the 2014–15 NCAA Division I men's basketball season. This was head coach Travis Ford's seventh season at Oklahoma State. The Cowboys were members of the Big 12 Conference and played their home games at the Gallagher-Iba Arena. They finished the season 18–14, 8–10 in Big 12 play to finish in a three way tie for sixth place. They lost in the quarterfinals of the Big 12 tournament to Oklahoma. They received an at-large bid to the NCAA tournament where they lost in second round to Oregon.

Departures

Recruits

Roster
Source

Schedule and results

|-
!colspan=9 style="background:#000000; color:#FF6600;"| Exhibition

|-
!colspan=9 style="background:#000000; color:#FF6600;"| Non-conference regular season

|-
!colspan=9 style="background:#000000; color:#FF6600;"|Conference regular season

|-
!colspan=9 style="background:#000000; color:#FF6600;"| Big 12 tournament

|-
!colspan=9 style="background:#000000; color:#FF6600;"| NCAA tournament

CSN = Cowboy Sports Network. The Cowboy Sports Network is affiliated with Fox Sports Net. Games could air on Fox Sports Oklahoma, Fox Sports Oklahoma Plus, Fox Sports Southwest, Fox Sports Southwest Plus, or Fox College Sports.

Rankings

*AP does not release post-tournament rankings

References

Oklahoma State Cowboys basketball seasons
Oklahoma State
Oklahoma State
2014 in sports in Oklahoma
2015 in sports in Oklahoma